David Rea Cochran (April 9, 1915 – October 30, 2001) was bishop of the Episcopal Diocese of Alaska from 1974 to 1981.

Biography
Cochran was born in Buffalo, New York, on April 9, 1915, to Clement Cochran and Agnes Haynes. In 1939 he graduated from the Episcopal Theological School in Cambridge, Massachusetts, after obtaining his B.A. degree from Hamilton College, New York, in 1936. He was ordained deacon in February 1940 by Bishop Henry Hobson, and priest on September 14, 1940, by Bishop Lewis Bliss Whittemore of Western Michigan. He served as curate at St Mark's Church in Grand Rapids, Michigan between 1940 and 1942, and then rector of St Paul's Church in Dowagiac, Michigan until 1948. During World War II he served as a U.S. Army chaplain. From 1946 to 1952, Cochran was also the Episcopal chaplain at the University of Washington in Seattle.

Bishop
On August 28, 1974, Bishop Cochran was consecrated by Presiding Bishop John Allin. Co-consecrators were William Gordon, former Bishop of Alaska and George T. Masuda, Bishop of North Dakota. Bishop Cochran had served as director of the Dakota Leadership Training program prior to his election to Alaska. A typical Alaskan welcome was given to Cochran following the consecration, and included native entertainment by the Arctic Coast Dancers and Singers and the Minto Dancers and Singers. Cochran retired in 1981 and settled in the Washington where he served as Vicar of Holy Family of Jesus Cambodian Church between 1984 and 1988 and as interim rector at St. Matthew's Church in Tacoma, Washington.

Death
Bishop Cochran died on October 30, 2001, during his sleep. He died 24 hours after submitting his memoirs for proofreading.

Personal life
Cochran married Mary Elizabeth Zabriskie and they have three children.

References

External links
 David Cochran Consecrated Bishop of Alaska
 Bishop Cochran Dies

1915 births
2001 deaths
20th-century American Episcopalians
Episcopal bishops of Alaska
20th-century American clergy